The Symphony Orchestra of Donetsk Philharmonic Society is an orchestra based on Lenin Square in Donetsk, Ukraine.
Notable members include but are not limited to 
 Roman Krasnovsky
 Goran Bregović

References

Culture in Donetsk
Symphony orchestras
Ukrainian culture